A colossal statue is one that is more than twice life-size. This is a list of colossal statues and other sculptures that were created, mostly or all carved, and remain in situ. This list includes two colossal stones that were intended to be moved. However, they were never broken free of the quarry in which they were carved, and therefore they would be considered carved in situ. Most of these were carved in ancient times.

In many cases, especially in India, these sculptures were carved out of softer rocks like sandstone or volcanic tuff. However, in some cases they were carved out of harder rocks like basalt, or even granite in the case of the unfinished obelisk in Egypt. The Egyptians may have been limited to using  dolerite balls to chip away at the granite. Dynamite was used in the carving of Mount Rushmore, one of the few colossal sculptures that was carved out of granite.

Africa

Egypt 
Great Sphinx of Giza – limestone
Abu Simbel temples – sandstone
The unfinished obelisk at Aswan – granite
Seti I  – limestone

Ethiopia 
Lalibela – tuff
Church of Saint George, Lalibela – tuff

Asia

Afghanistan 
Buddhas of Bamiyan, destroyed in 2001 by the Taliban

Armenia 
 Geghard Monastery

China 
 Fuxi sculpture at Xianshan Mountain, Xiangyang
 Leshan Giant Buddha
 Bingling Temple

India 

 Ajanta Caves
 Badami Cave Temples
 Barabar Caves
 Marjing Polo Statue
 Cave temples
 Elephanta Caves
 Ellora Caves
 Kailashnath Temple, Ellora
 Kanheri Caves
 Mahabalipuram 
 Vijayanagara

Iran 
 Behistun
 Naqsh-e Rostam
 Taq-e Bostan
 Colossal Statue of Shapur I, Shapur cave

Jordan 
 Petra

Lebanon 
 The stone of the south

Russia 
 Buryatia Buddha

Saudi Arabia 
 Mada'in Saleh

Sri Lanka 
 Avukana Buddha statue 
 Gal Vihara
 Sigiriya

Turkey 
 Cappadocia
 Tombs of the kings of Pontus
 Rock tombs
 Mount Nemrut

Americas

Colombia 
Salt Cathedral of Zipaquirá, Cundinamarca

Ecuador 
El poder brutal, Quito

Peru 
Chachapoya cliff tombs at Revash
Chavín de Huantar's Old Temple

United States 
Mount Rushmore, South Dakota – granite
Crazy Horse Memorial, South Dakota – pegmatite granite (work in progress)
Stone Mountain, Georgia – granite

Europe

Bulgaria 
Madara Rider

Czech Republic 
Čertovy hlavy

Greece 
 Lion of Bavaria, Nafplio

Italy 
Pantalica, Sicily
Santoni, Sicily
Sassi di Matera, Basilicata

Romania 
Rock sculpture of Decebalus

Switzerland 
Lion Monument

See also 
Rock-cut architecture
Indian rock-cut architecture

Other lists 
List of statues; by height; in U.S.A.
List of Roman domes
New 7 Wonders of the World

References 

Colossal sculpture in situ

colossal sculpture in situ
colossal sculpture in situ